Vivienne Cleven (born 1968) is an Indigenous Australian fiction author and writer of the Kamilaroi people. Her writing includes the novels Bitin’ Back and Her Sister’s Eye.

Early life 
Born in 1968 in Surat, Queensland, Cleven grew up in the homeland of her Aboriginal heritage (Kamilaroi Nation). Leaving school at thirteen, she worked with her father as a jillaroo: building fences, mustering cattle, and working various jobs on stations throughout Queensland and New South Wales.

Writing career 
In 2000, with the manuscript Just Call Me Jean, Cleven entered and won the David Unaipon Award for unpublished Indigenous writers. Retitled and published the following year, Bitin’ Back was shortlisted in the 2002 Courier-Mail Book of the Year Award and in the 2002 South Australian Premier’s Award for Fiction. Cleven adapted Bitin’ Back into a playscript in 2005 which was staged by Brisbane’s Kooemba Jdarra Indigenous Theatre Company.

Her Sister’s Eye was published in 2002, and was chosen in the 2003 People’s Choice shortlist of One Book One Brisbane. In 2004, Her Sister’s Eye won the Victorian Premier's Literary Awards Prize for Indigenous Writing.

In 2006, Cleven won the Kate Challis RAKA Award for both Bitin' Back and Her Sister's Eye.

Cleven’s writing is included in Fresh Cuttings, the first anthology of UQP Black Australian Writing, published in 2003, and the collection Contemporary Indigenous Plays in 2007.

In 2017, Cleven penned a column for the journal Lesbians on the Loose, entitled, “Dyketopia: The Internet's most popular cyberspace precinct has plenty going on for lesbians.”

Themes 
Cleven’s works delve into themes of gender identity, queer expression, mental health, domestic and sexual abuse, connection to land, and racial prejudice in a postcolonial Australian context. Both Bitin' Back and Her Sister's Eye critically forefront the Indigenous woman's experience in situations where their race and gender are seminal to their stories. Her Sister's Eye is considered part of the modern wave of postcolonial gothic fiction.

Published works 

 Bitin' Back, 2001
 "Writing Bitin’ Back." Writing Queensland, no. 96, 2001
Her Sister’s Eye, 2002
 "Bitin’ Back." Contemporary Indigenous Plays, 2007
 "Dyketopia: The Internet's most popular cyberspace precinct has plenty going on for lesbians.” Lesbians on the Loose, vol. 18, no. 11, 2007

Awards 
Bitin’ Back (2000):

 Winner of the David Unaipon Award, 2000
 Shortlisted for the Courier-Mail Book of the Year Award, 2002
 Shortlisted for the South Australian Premier's Awards for Fiction, 2002 
 Winner of the Kate Challis RAKA Award, 2006

Her Sister’s Eye (2002):

 People's Choice shortlist of One Book One Brisbane, 2003
 Winner of the Kate Challis RAKA Award, 2006 
 Winner of the Victorian Premier's Literary Awards Prize for Indigenous Writing, 2004

References

External links 
 Photo of Vivienne Cleven

Australian women novelists
Australian women dramatists and playwrights
Indigenous Australian writers
1968 births
Living people
People from South West Queensland
Australian LGBT novelists
Australian LGBT dramatists and playwrights
Lesbian novelists
Lesbian dramatists and playwrights